Helena Bargholtz (born 1942 in Lidingö, Stockholm County) is a Swedish Liberal People's Party politician. She was a member of the Riksdag from 1998 to 2006, and from 2009 onwards, although she threatened to leave her party over the controversy of the prostitution laws started by fellow Liberal MP Camilla Lindberg.

External links
Helena Bargholtz at the Riksdag website

1942 births
Living people
People from Lidingö Municipality
Members of the Riksdag from the Liberals (Sweden)
Women members of the Riksdag
Members of the Riksdag 1998–2002
Members of the Riksdag 2002–2006
Members of the Riksdag 2006–2010
20th-century Swedish women politicians
20th-century Swedish politicians
21st-century Swedish women politicians